Patrick Henry Cronin,  (30 November 1913 – 9 February 1991) was an Irish, Roman Catholic, Columban archbishop and missionary. He was the second Archbishop of Cagayan de Oro in the Philippines, serving during World War II.

Background
Born Patrick Henry Cronin on 30 November 1913 in Moneygall, County Offaly, Ireland. He was ordained priest on 21 December 1937.

Cronin attended the Tullamore Christian Brothers School and St. Finian's College in Mullingar, Ireland. In 1931, he entered the Dalgan Park the Columban Fathers' Seminary. Six years later, he was ordained as priest under the Missionary Society of St. Columban.

Ministry
On 24 May 1955 Cronin was appointed as Prelate of Ozamiz in the Philippines. Concurrently, he was the Titular Bishop of Ubaza. Upon the retirement Archbishop James Hayes on 13 October 1970, he was appointed as Archbishop of Cagayan de Oro in 1971.

As Archbishop of Cagayan de Oro, he established the St. John Vianney Theological Seminary in Cagayan de Oro, an interdiocesan theological seminary that provides formation for candidates for priesthood. After retiring on 5 January 1988 he was succeeded by Jesus Tuquib and given the title Archbishop Emeritus. He then lived at the archdiocesan seminary until his death on 9 February 1991 in Maria Reyna Hospital (now Maria Reyna Xavier University Hospital) in Cagayan de Oro, Philippines. His remains had been interred at the Saint Augustine Metropolitan Cathedral.

See also
 Missionary Society of St. Columban
 Roman Catholic Archdiocese of Cagayan de Oro

References

Participants in the Second Vatican Council
20th-century Roman Catholic archbishops in the Philippines
Roman Catholic archbishops of Cagayan de Oro
1913 births
1991 deaths
Irish expatriate Catholic bishops
People educated at St Finian's College
Missionary Society of St. Columban